Krępice may refer to the following places in Poland:
Krępice, Lower Silesian Voivodeship (south-west Poland)
Krępice, Świętokrzyskie Voivodeship (south-central Poland)